The 2015 FC Irtysh Pavlodar season is the 24th successive season that the club will play in the Kazakhstan Premier League, the highest tier of association football in Kazakhstan. Irtysh will also participate in the Kazakhstan Cup.

Season events
On 8 May, following the club's fifth defeat of the season, manager Dmitri Cheryshev was sacked and Sergey Klimov appointed as caretaker manager. Dimitar Dimitrov was appointed as the club's permanent manager on 1 June.

Squad

Out on loan

Transfers

Winter

In:

Out:

Summer

In:

Out:

Competitions

Kazakhstan Premier League

First round

Results summary

Results by round

Results

League table

Championship round

Results summary

Results by round

Results

League table

Kazakhstan Cup

Squad statistics

Appearances and goals

|-
|colspan="14"|Players away from Irtysh on loan:
|-
|colspan="14"|Players who appeared for Irtysh that left during the season:

|}

Goal scorers

Disciplinary record

References

External links
 Official Site

Irtysh
FC Irtysh Pavlodar seasons